A sleepover is a social occasion where a young person stays at the home of a friend. Multiple people and/or friends may sleepover at the friend's home, typically a younger person will partake in a sleepover, however an adult or older person may sleep at a friend's home. A slumber party or a pajama party in essence is the same thing as a sleepover.

Characteristics 
A sleepover is an event when a child, without adult presence, spends the night in the presence of other children. The sleepover is often seen as a rite of passage for a young child or teenager, as they begin to assert independence and to develop social connections outside the immediate family.

Teen sleepovers 
Beginning in the 1990s, commentators wrote about a perceived new trend of parents endorsing sleepovers for teenagers, with both boys and girls staying overnight together. While some writers decried the trend, others defended it as a safer alternative to teenage dating outside the house.

References

External links

Parties
Sleep
Childhood